Played on Pepper is the third studio album by the Danish soft rock band Michael Learns to Rock. It was released on 28 August 1995 by Medley Records in Europe. The first single from the album was "Someday" (1995), followed by "That's Why (You Go Away)" (1995), "How Many Hours" (1996), "Love Will Never Lie" (1996).

As of May 1996, the album had sold 1 million copies worldwide, with 120,000 of them being sold in Denmark.

Track listing

References

External links
Official website

1995 albums
Michael Learns to Rock albums